Olusegun Abraham  (born ) is a Nigerian politician and businessman.

Early life and education
Olusegun was born and raised in Ikare-Akoko, Ondo State, where he had his early formal education. He holds a master's degree in Technology management. He has also undertaken professional courses in notable institutions including Tyndale University College and Seminary, Canada and the Institute of Directors, United Kingdom.

Career
In 1999, Segun Abraham delved into politics while managing his business ventures simultaneously. He was one of the pioneering members of the All Progressives Congress when it was still called Alliance for Democracy. Olusegun was also one of those who campaigned for former Governor Adebayo Adefarati. He went on to be appointed the chairman of Owena Hotels by Adebayo Farati until the hotel was bought by Oodua Investment.

In 2012, he declared his intention to run for Governor of Ondo State under the platform of the Action Congress of Nigeria but he however came short of Rotimi Akeredolu who went on to represent the party as its aspirant.

He was one of the two aspirants under the platform of the All Progressives Congress who ran for the office of Governor at the 2016 Ondo State gubernatorial election, but lost out to Oluwarotimi Akeredolu at the primaries.

References

External links

Living people
1953 births
People from Ondo State
All Progressives Congress politicians
Nigerian businesspeople
Yoruba politicians
Yoruba businesspeople